Cierra is the given name of the following people:

 Cierra Burdick (born 1993), American professional basketball player
 Cierra Dillard (born 1996), American Professional basketball player
 Cierra Fields (born 1999), American activist
 Cierra Kaler-Jones (born 1993), American beauty pageant titleholder
 Cierra Ramirez (born 1995), American actress and singer
 Cierra Runge (born 1996), American competition swimmer
 Cierra Jackson, American beauty queen in Miss District of Columbia 2016

See also
 Ciara (disambiguation)
 Ciera (disambiguation)
 Sierra (disambiguation)